Lyman Wesley Bostock Sr. (March 11, 1918 – June 24, 2005) was an American baseball player who played first base for several Negro league teams from 1938 to 1954. He batted left-handed and threw right-handed.

Bostock played for the Brooklyn Royal Giants, Birmingham Black Barons, Chicago American Giants, Jackie Robinson All-Stars, Winnipeg Buffaloes, and Carman Cardinals. He played in the 1941 East-West All-Star Game while with Birmingham, and served in the US Army during World War II.

Like many Negro leaguers, Bostock wanted to play in Major League Baseball, but never got the chance. Bostock played in or attended various MLB old-timers games in the 1970s and 1980s, including 1976 in Minnesota, and 1989 in Kansas City.

Bostock died in 2005, in his hometown of Birmingham.

His son, Lyman Bostock Jr., played for the Minnesota Twins and California Angels from 1975 until he was shot and killed in his hometown of Gary, Indiana, during the 1978 season.

References

External links
 and  Seamheads
Lyman Bostock Sr. at the Negro League Baseball Players Association

1918 births
2005 deaths
American expatriate baseball players in Canada
Baseball players from Birmingham, Alabama
Birmingham Black Barons players
Brooklyn Royal Giants players
Carman Cardinals players
Chicago American Giants players
New York Cubans players
Winnipeg Buffaloes players
African Americans in World War II
United States Army personnel of World War II
Baseball infielders
21st-century African-American people
African-American United States Army personnel